Anna Hasenfratz is a Hungarian-American theoretical high energy physicist whose research involves non-perturbative theories, especially in lattice quantum chromodynamics. She is a professor of physics at the University of Colorado Boulder.

Education and career

She held postdoctoral and visiting positions at the Central Research Institute for Physics in Budapest, CERN in Geneva, and the University of Michigan. Next, she became an assistant research scientist and later associate professor at Florida State University from 1985 until 1988, when she moved to the University of Arizona. She moved again, to her present position at the University of Colorado Boulder, in 1989, and was promoted to full professor in 2006.

Recognition
In 2008, Hasenfratz was elected as a Fellow of the American Physical Society (APS), after a nomination from the APS Division of Particles and Fields, "for her studies of nonperturbative behavior in quantum field theory, including quantum chromodynamics and models for electroweak symmetry breaking, using lattice discretization and renormalization group methods.

Family
Together, they published "the first correct computation of the scale parameter of quantum chromodynamics on the lattice" in 1980; a later joint publication added a third Hasenfratz as coauthor, Péter's wife Etelka.

References

External links

Year of birth missing (living people)
Living people
21st-century American physicists
American women physicists
20th-century Hungarian physicists
Hungarian women physicists
Eötvös Loránd University alumni
Florida State University faculty
University of Colorado Boulder faculty
University of Arizona faculty
Fellows of the American Physical Society
People associated with CERN
American women academics
21st-century American women scientists